The 2013–14 Liga Alef season saw Hapoel Kfar Saba (champions of the North Division) and Maccabi Kiryat Gat (champions of the South Division) win the title and promotion to Liga Leumit.

The clubs which were ranked between 2nd to 5th places in each division competed in a promotion play-offs, in which the winner, Ironi Tiberias advanced to the final round, where they beat the 14th placed club in Liga Leumit, Hapoel Katamon Jerusalem 5-1 on aggregate. thus, Ironi Tiberias were also promoted to Liga Leumit.

At the bottom, the bottom two clubs in each division, Maccabi Kafr Kanna, Ahva Arraba (from North division), Maccabi Be'er Ya'akov and Bnei Eilat (from South division) were all automatically relegated to Liga Bet, whilst the two clubs which were ranked in 14th place in each division, Hapoel Daliyat al-Karmel and Maccabi Be'er Sheva were relegated after losing the relegation play-offs.

Changes from last season

Team changes
 Hapoel Afula and Hapoel Katamon Jerusalem were promoted to Liga Leumit; Hapoel Kfar Saba (to North division), Sektzia Nes Tziona (to South division) were relegated from Liga Leumit.
 Hapoel Kafr Kanna and Maccabi Sektzia Ma'alot-Tarshiha were relegated to Liga Bet from North division; Beitar Nahariya and Hapoel Beit She'an were promoted to the North division from Liga Bet.
 Hapoel Arad, Maccabi Ironi Kfar Yona and Ortodoxim Lod were relegated to Liga Bet from South division; Hapoel Mahane Yehuda, Maccabi Be'er Ya'akov and F.C. Kafr Qasim were promoted to the South division from Liga Bet.

North Division

South Division

Promotion play-offs

First round
Second and third placed clubs played single match at home against the fourth and fifth placed clubs in their respective regional division.

Ironi Tiberias and Hapoel Migdal HaEmek (from North division) and Hapoel Azor and Beitar Kfar Saba (from South division) advanced to the second round.

Second round
The winners of the first round played single match at home of the higher ranked club (from each regional division).

Ironi Tiberias and Hapoel Azor advanced to the third round.

Third round
Ironi Tiberias and Hapoel Azor faced each other for a single match in neutral venue. the winner advanced to the fourth round against the 14th placed club in Liga Leumit.

Ironi Tiberias advanced to the promotion/relegation play-offs.

Fourth round - promotion/relegation play-offs
Ironi Tiberias faced the 14th placed in 2013–14 Liga Leumit Hapoel Katamon Jerusalem. the winner on aggregate earned a spot in the 2014–15 Liga Leumit. The matches took place on May 23 and 27, 2014.

Ironi Tiberias won 5–1 on aggregate and promoted to Liga Leumit. Hapoel Katamon Jerusalem relegated to Liga Alef.

Relegation play-offs

North play-off
The 14th placed club in Liga Alef North, Hapoel Daliyat al-Karmel, faced the Liga Bet North play-offs winner. the winner earned a spot in the 2014–15 Liga Alef.

Liga B North A play-off

Semi-finals

Final

Liga B North B play-off

Semi-finals

Final

Regional final

Relegation/promotion match

Maccabi Sektzia Ma'alot-Tarshiha Promoted to Liga Alef; Hapoel Daliyat al-Karmel relegated to Liga Bet.

South play-off
The 14th placed club in Liga Alef South, Maccabi Be'er Sheva, faced the Liga Bet North play-offs winner. the winner earned a spot in the 2014–15 Liga Alef.

Liga B South A play-off

Semi-finals

Final

Liga B South B play-off

Semi-finals

Final

Regional final

Relegation/promotion match

Hapoel Hod HaSharon Promoted to Liga Alef; Maccabi Be'er Sheva relegated to Liga Bet; However, they were eventually reprieved from relegation, after Ironi Bat Yam, which have finished 12th in Liga Alef South, folded during the summer.

References
Liga Alef North 2013/2014 The Israel Football Association 
Liga Alef South 2013/2014 The Israel Football Association 

3
Liga Alef seasons
Israel